The 2011–12 OK Liga Femenina was the fourth edition of Spain's premier women's rink hockey championship, running from 5 November 2011 to 2 June 2012. Defending champion CP Voltregà won its seventh title including the old Spanish Championship. Girona CH was the runner-up, and Igualada HC and Gijón HC also qualified for the 2013 European League. On the other hand, PHC Sant Cugat and previous season's runner-up CE Arenys de Munt were relegated. Despite losing all 26 games Vigo Stick Traviesas was again spared.

Teams

Standings

source:Federación Española de Patinaje

Top scorers

Copa de la Reina

The 2012 Copa de la Reina was the 7th edition of the Spanish women's roller hockey cup. It was played at the Pavelló d'Esports de Reus, Reus, between the first three qualified teams after the first half of the season and Reus as host team.

Two golden goals allowed Biesca Gijón to win its first Cup.

References

ok liga femenina
ok liga femenina
OK Liga Femenina seasons